Pardosuchus is an extinct genus of therocephalians known from the Permian of South Africa.

References 

Fossil taxa described in 1908
Therocephalia
Permian fossil record